The St. Francis University College of Health and Allied Sciences (SFUCHAS) is a constituent college of St. Augustine University of Tanzania,

The college was established in 2010 by the Tanzania Episcopal Conference (TEC) based on the need of the Catholic Church to contribute to the training of more doctors and other Health Professionals in Tanzania. The college was provisionally registered by the Tanzania Commission for Universities (TCU) on 2 November 2010 and was fully registered in September 2013.

The college is the second Medical school after the former Weill Bugando in Mwanza, now Catholic University of Health and Allied Sciences (CUHAS) to be established and owned by the Catholic Bishops of Tanzania.

St. Francis University College of Health and Allied Sciences is located in Ifakara town; an administrative home of the Kilombero district, in Morogoro region lying 420 km South-West of Dar-s-Salaam and 230 km from Morogoro Town. It is the first medical school to be established in rural town of Tanzania.
 
The college offers the following academic programs:-

	Technician Certificate in Medical Laboratory Sciences.
	Technician Certificate in Pharmaceutical Sciences
	Diploma in Medical Laboratory Sciences 
	Diploma in Pharmaceutical Sciences 
	Doctor of Medicine Degree (MD)

Future Programs to be offered:-
 
	Bachelor of Medical Laboratory Sciences
	Bachelor of Science in Nursing  
	Bachelor of Science in Biological Anthropology
	Doctor of Dentistry
	Master of Human Resource for Health
	Master of Public Health
	Master of Medicine (Obstetrics and Gynecology, Surgery, Pediatrics and Internal Medicine).
	MSc. Medical Microbiology/Immunology

References

External links
 

Colleges in Tanzania
St. Augustine University of Tanzania
Educational institutions established in 2010
2010 establishments in Tanzania